R&R Colony Ponnathota (Dathapuram) is a Smart Village located in Jammalamadugu Mandal, Kadapa district, Andhra Pradesh, India. R&R Colony Ponnathota (Dathapuram) is under the constituency of Jammalamadugu. R&R Colony Ponnathota (Dathapuram) is situated along the bank of the Penna River. Mylavaram dam is constructed just 3 km away from it, that supplies water for drinking. R&R Colony Ponnathota (Dathapuram) is also famous for people making silk sarees with their own hands.

In the village, people of all religions are living together. There are religion temples of Sri Chodeswari, Ramalayam, and Pedhamma Temple, etc. where all the religions people are celebrating their festivals grandly. A major ceremony held is "Jyothi Uthsavas" at the time of Ugadi. Ganesh Chaturthi is also celebrated very well. Here, it is not only the religion's temple but also the 5 national temples. The Elementary school has well constructed buildings and playground. In spite of the huge competition from the present corporate studies, the students of this Elementary school are showing their talent public exams by getting top marks in district level.

Demographics
 India census, R&R Colony Ponnathota (Dathapuram) had a population of 500. Males constitute 51% of the population and females 49%. R&R Colony Ponnathota (Dathapuram) has an average literacy rate of 54%, lower than the national average of 59.5%: male literacy is 67% and, female literacy is 40%. In R&R Colony Ponnathota (Dathapuram), 12% of the population is under 6 years of age.

References

Census towns in Andhra Pradesh